Teiyō Maru was an auxiliary fleet oiler of the Imperial Japanese Navy (IJN) during World War II. She was converted from civilian service to a naval auxiliary as the Pearl Harbor attack force sailed; and participated in the major offensive operations of the first six months of Pacific combat. She then served in the northern Pacific until July 1944, and was sunk in the battle for convoy Hi-71 when reassigned to the defense of the Philippines.

History
Teiyō Maru was completed as a civilian tanker in 1931 and requisitioned by the Navy as a replenishment oiler on 22 November 1941. Yokohama Dock Company completed the conversion to a naval auxiliary on 4 December 1941.

Teiyō Maru served with replenishment group no. 1 for the Java Invasion Force, and later with replenishment group no. 2 for the Indian Ocean raid, and with the 5th Fleet for the Japanese occupation of Attu and Kiska. Teiyō Maru was then converted for cold weather operations and served for two years as a replenishment oiler for ships between Hokkaido and the Aleutian Islands.

On 30 July 1944 Teiyō Maru was attached to convoy Hi-71 carrying Operation Shō reinforcements to the Philippines.

References

World War II naval ships of Japan
Auxiliary ships of the Imperial Japanese Navy
World War II tankers
Ships of the Aleutian Islands campaign
Ships sunk by American submarines
1931 ships
Oilers